Sik Kwang Sheng is the current vice president of the Singapore Buddhist Federation, the abbot of Kong Meng San Phor Kark See Monastery, and the founder of the Buddhist College of Singapore.

Early life 
Effectively bilingual, Kwang Sheng was educated in Victoria School. He was ordained as a monk in 1980 and became a disciple of Ven Hong Choon (宏船法师). Kwang Sheng reportedly suffered from tinnitus which he sought treatments for.

Career 
Kwang Sheng has been the president of the Singapore Buddhist Federation since 2006, and is the sixth abbot of Kong Meng San Phor Kark See Monastery since 2004. He has helmed KMSPKS since 1995 as its chief administrator, and founded the Buddhist College of Singapore in 2005. Past appointments include the president of the Inter-Religious Organisation in Singapore, the chairman of the Maha Bodhi School Management Committee, Manjusri Secondary School Management Committee and the Mee Toh School Management Committee. Some other entities that he sits on with honorary appointments include Singapore Buddhist Free Clinic and Bright Hill Evergreen Home, which is named after Kong Meng San Phor Kark See Monastery

He was awarded an honorary doctorate degree in educational administration on May 1 2011 by Mahachulalongkornrajavidyalaya University of Thailand in recognition of his outstanding contributions towards Buddhism.

Kwang Sheng is also an avid Buddhist musician and has co-produced several bestselling albums such as Reverence, Buddha Smiles, Collection of Buddhist Songs and Om Mani Padme Hum.

In 2014, Kwang Sheng became the first non-Muslim religious leader in Singapore to make a donation to the Aid to Syrian Refugees in Turkey (Asrit) initiative.

References

External links 
Kong Meng San Phor Kark See Monastery website

Living people
Singaporean religious leaders
Singaporean Buddhist monks
Chan Buddhist monks
Victoria School, Singapore alumni
Singaporean people of Chinese descent
Year of birth missing (living people)